The Hong Kong China Temple, formerly the Hong Kong Temple, is the 48th operating temple of the Church of Jesus Christ of Latter-day Saints (LDS Church).

The LDS Church first sent missionaries to Hong Kong in 1853. Almost 140 years later, in 1992, then-First Counselor in the First Presidency, Gordon B. Hinckley, announced plans to build a temple in the territory. Finding a site on which to build, however, proved difficult, especially given the high cost of real estate in the area.  Finally, it was decided that the temple would be built on the site of the existing mission home and chapel.

Because of the land shortage in the territory, the temple had to be 'built up' instead of 'spreading out' to build. This scarcity of space contributed to the unique design of the Hong Kong Temple. The six-story building is designed to house not only the temple, but also a chapel, mission offices, and living quarters for the temple president and several missionaries. 
	
The dedication of the Hong Kong China Temple took place on May 26, 1996. The temple serves church members from parts of India, Thailand, Sri Lanka, Singapore, Mongolia, Guam, Hong Kong, Malaysia, Cambodia, Micronesia, Marshall Islands, and Indonesia.

On January 29, 2019 the LDS Church announced the temple's July 8, 2019 closing for renovations. Following completion of the renovations, the temple was rededicated by Gerrit W. Gong on June 19, 2022.

See also

 Comparison of temples of The Church of Jesus Christ of Latter-day Saints
 List of temples of The Church of Jesus Christ of Latter-day Saints
 List of temples of The Church of Jesus Christ of Latter-day Saints by geographic region
 Temple architecture (Latter-day Saints)
 The Church of Jesus Christ of Latter-day Saints in Hong Kong

Notes

External links
 
 Official Hong Kong China Temple page
 Hong Kong China Temple page

20th-century Latter Day Saint temples
Christianity in Hong Kong
Meetinghouses of the Church of Jesus Christ of Latter-day Saints
Office buildings in Hong Kong
Religious buildings and structures in Hong Kong
Religious buildings and structures completed in 1996
Temples (LDS Church) in Asia
The Church of Jesus Christ of Latter-day Saints in China
The Church of Jesus Christ of Latter-day Saints in Hong Kong
1996 establishments in Hong Kong